Kartsopheli  (Qaratyqæw — ″village of the Qaratæ″ ) is a village in the historical region of Khevi, north-eastern Georgia. It is located on the left bank of the river Tergi. Administratively, it is part of the Kazbegi Municipality in Mtskheta-Mtianeti. Distance to the municipality center Stepantsminda is 38 km.

Sources 
 Georgian Soviet Encyclopedia, V. 4, p. 404, Tbilisi, 1979 year.

References

Kobi Community villages